The Ministry of Internal Security is a ministry responsible for ensuring the safety of both Somali nationals as well as expatriates living within the country. This ministry is also tasked with ensuring police officers in the country get paid. As of the 2010s,  law enforcement associated with this ministry operates in the regions of Galmudug, Jubaland, South West State of Somalia and Hirshabelle. The current Minister of Internal Security is Abdullahi Mohamed Nor.

See also
 Agriculture in Somalia

References

Government ministries of Somalia